The 69th San Sebastián International Film Festival took place from 17 to 25 September 2021 in San Sebastián, Gipuzkoa, Spain. The festival opened with Zhang Yimou's One Second. Marion Cotillard and Johnny Depp were awarded the Donostia Award for lifetime achievements. The Donostia Award bestowed to Johnny Depp was mired by controversy and public scrutiny.

The competitive awards were presented on 25 September 2021. Blue Moon by Alina Grigore won the Golden Shell award, whereas Jessica Chastain (The Eyes of Tammy Faye) shared the Silver Shell for Best Leading Performance (a new non-gendered category replacing the former gendered acting awards) with Danish teen  (As in Heaven).

Juries 
Official Selection
 Dea Kulumbegashvili
 Susi Sánchez
 Maite Alberdi
 Audrey Diwan
 Ted Hope
Horizontes latinos
 María Zamora
 
 Luciano Monteagudo
New Directors
 Mary Burke
 Irene Escolar
 Suzanne Lindon
Zabaltegi-Tabakalera
 
 Miriam Heard
 Elena López Riera

Sections

Official Selection 
In competition
The lineup of films selected for the Official Selection is as follows:
Highlighted title indicates award winner.

Out of competition
The following works (including a short and a miniseries) were selected to screen out of competition:

Latin Horizons 
The following films were selected for the Latin Horizons section:
Highlighted title indicates award winner.

New Directors 
The following films were selected for the New Directors section:
Highlighted title indicates award winner.
{| class="sortable wikitable" style="width:100%; margin-bottom:4px" cellpadding="5"
|-
!scope="col" | English title
!scope="col" | Original title
!scope="col" | Director(s)
!scope="col" | Production countrie(s)
|-
| colspan = "2" | Carajita || Silvina Schnicer, Ulises Porra || 
|-
| That Weekend ||  || Mara Pescio || 
|-
| Aloners || Honja Saneun Salamdeul · 혼자 사는 사람들 || Hong Sung-eun || South Korea
|-
| Between Two Dawns ||  || Selman Nacar || 
|-
| Inventory ||  || Darko Sinko || Slovenia
|-
| Josephine ||  || Javier Marco || Spain
|-
| The Rust ||  || Juan Sebastián Mesa || 
|-
| Hilda's Short Summer || Las vacaciones de Hilda || Agustin Banchero || 
|-
| The Noise of Engines ||  || Philippe Grégoire || Canada
|-
| Mikado || Marocco || Emanuel Parvu || 
|-
| colspan = "2" | Mass || Fran Kranz || United States
|- style="background:#EEDD82"
| Unwanted || Nich'ya || Lena Lanskih || Russia
|-
| Lost in Summer || Shu qi shi guang || Sun Liang || China
|}

 Zabaltegi-Tabakalera 
The following films were selected for the Zabaltegi-Tabakalera section:
Highlighted title indicates award winner.

 Donostia Award Screenings 
The following film was selected for the Donostia Award Screenings section:

 Official Selection Awards 
 Golden Shell: Blue Moon by Alina Grigore
 Special Jury Prize: Earwig by Lucile Hadžihalilović
 Silver Shell for Best Director: Tea Lindeburg (As in Heaven)
 Silver Shell for Best Leading Performance:  (As in Heaven) & Jessica Chastain (The Eyes of Tammy Faye)
 Silver Shell for Best Supporting Performance: cast of Who's Stopping Us Best Screenplay: Terence Davies (Benediction)
 Best Cinematography: Claire Mathon (Undercover'')

Special Awards 
Donostia Award for lifetime achievements: Marion Cotillard and Johnny Depp

References 

September 2021 events in Spain
San Sebastián International Film Festival
2021 in the Basque Country (autonomous community)
San Sebastian